Samantha "Sami" Hill (born June 8, 1992) is an American water polo goalkeeper. She was part of the gold medal-winning American team at the 2015 World Aquatics Championships, where she played in the goalkeeper position. She was also part of the gold medal-winning American teams at the 2015 Pan American Games and 2016 Summer Olympics.

See also
 United States women's Olympic water polo team records and statistics
 List of Olympic champions in women's water polo
 List of Olympic medalists in water polo (women)
 List of women's Olympic water polo tournament goalkeepers
 List of world champions in women's water polo
 List of World Aquatics Championships medalists in water polo

References

External links
 

1992 births
Living people
Sportspeople from Honolulu
American female water polo players
Water polo goalkeepers
Water polo players at the 2016 Summer Olympics
Medalists at the 2016 Summer Olympics
Olympic gold medalists for the United States in water polo
World Aquatics Championships medalists in water polo
Water polo players at the 2015 Pan American Games
Pan American Games medalists in water polo
Pan American Games gold medalists for the United States
Medalists at the 2015 Pan American Games
21st-century American women